The Salak Selatan Komuter station is a KTM Komuter train station located near the township of Salak South, Kuala Lumpur. Facing the Salak Expressway off Exit 2704 of the highway, the station is situated about 400 metres south of the old town of Salak South.

The station primarily is served by the Seremban Line. The station was built along four rail tracks. The station, like many stations along the KTM Komuter lines, has only two platforms for northbound or southbound passengers. The platforms are served by the two outermost tracks, while the middle inner tracks are used as bypass tracks for trains that do not stop at the station. The station in charge of managing railway switches and supports a small railway staff team. The station is also linked to storage facilities and machinery for track maintenance.

The  Salak Selatan LRT station, located next to the old portion of Salak South, is also situated 400 metres away from the Komuter station, requiring passengers to leave any of the two stations to walk along a stretch of road to reach the other station. Due to the distance between both stations and despite sharing the same name, they are not effectively integrated or regarded as connecting stations.

The Komuter station is located in Kampung Baru Salak Selatan, a newer portion of Salak South development. On official railway maps, the location of the station is added to the Komuter station to differentiate it with the LRT station.

Seremban Line
Railway stations in Kuala Lumpur